Hälsinge Wing, also F 15 Söderhamn, or simply F 15,  is a former Swedish Air Force wing with the main base located near Söderhamn in northern Sweden.

Heraldry and traditions

Coat of arms
The first coat of arms of the Hälsinge Wing was used from 1945 to 1994. Blazon: "Sable, the provincial badge of Hälsingland, a buck rampant or, armed and langued gules." The second coat of arms was used from 1994 to 1997. Blazon: "Sable, the provincial badge of Hälsingland, a buck rampant or, armed and langued gules, a chief azure over a barrulet or, charged with a winged twobladed propeller of the last colour."

Colours, standards and guidons
A colour was presented to the wing in Söderhamn in March 1949 by the Chief of the Air Force, Lieutenant General Bengt Nordenskiöld. Blazon: "On blue cloth in the centre the badge of the Air Force; a winged two-bladed propeller under a royal crown proper, all yellow. In the first corner the provincial badge of Hälsingland; a yellow buck rampant, armed and langued red."

March
”Hälsinge flygflottiljs marsch” by Jörgen Lidberg. It's a march arrangement of "When the Saints Go Marching In". The march was established on 15 August 1967.

Commanding officers
Commanding officers from 1945 to 1997. The commanding officer was referred to as "wing commander" and had the rank of colonel.

1945–1960: Gösta Seth
1960–1965: Olof Knutsson
1965–1972: Sven Lampell
1972–1975: Ingvar Hedin
1975–1978: Gunnar Unell
1978–1981: Åke Sjögren
1981–1987: Roland Magndahl
1987–1994: Sven Borgvald
1994–1997: Christer Hjort
1998–1998: Sture Gafvelin (acting)

Names, designations and locations

See also
 Swedish Air Force
 List of military aircraft of Sweden

Footnotes

References

Notes

Print

Web

Further reading

External links

F 15 Air Force Museum (in Swedish)

Wings of the Swedish Air Force
Military units and formations established in 1945
Military units and formations disestablished in 1998
1945 establishments in Sweden
1998 disestablishments in Sweden
Disbanded units and formations of Sweden